Landed gentry usually refers to a largely historical British social class consisting in theory of landowners who could live entirely from rental income, or at least had a country estate.

Landed gentry may also refer to:
Burke's Landed Gentry, a directory of British landed gentry
Landed gentry in China, the elite shenshi class in China
Polish landed gentry, a historical group of hereditary landowners who held manorial estates in Poland

See also
Gentry (disambiguation)
Landed (disambiguation)